Aim Rocks is a group of rocks lying east of Cape Timblón in the middle of Morton Strait in the South Shetland Islands, Antarctica. The name, given by the United Kingdom Antarctic Place-Names Committee in 1961, is descriptive; these rocks in line are a guide for safe passage through the southern entrance of Morton Strait.

See also
 List of Antarctic and subantarctic islands

Maps
 L.L. Ivanov et al. Antarctica: Livingston Island and Greenwich Island, South Shetland Islands. Scale 1:100000 topographic map. Sofia: Antarctic Place-names Commission of Bulgaria, 2005.
 L.L. Ivanov. Antarctica: Livingston Island and Greenwich, Robert, Snow and Smith Islands. Scale 1:120000 topographic map.  Troyan: Manfred Wörner Foundation, 2009.

References
 SCAR Composite Antarctic Gazetteer.

Rock formations of Antarctica